The 1928 Welsh Cup Final, the 47th in the competition, was contested by Bangor and Cardiff City at Farrar Road Stadium, Bangor. Cardiff won 2–0.

Route to the final

Cardiff City

Bangor City

Bangor City started their campaign away to Flint Town. After a 1–1 draw, Bangor replayed them at Farrar Road Stadium, where Bangor won 4–1.

In two more home games in the Fourth and Fifth rounds, Bangor saw off both Buckley and Connah's Quay by 3–0.

For the Sixth round, Bangor travelled south to former Football League and Southern League team Aberdare Athletic. After a 1–1 draw Aberdare lost 7–3 at Farrar Road.

In the Semi-final, Bangor faced Football League Division Three South members Merthyr Town at Colwyn Bay. A 2–2 meant a replay at Oswestry where Bangor progressed to the final after a 2–0 win.

Match

Report

Detail

MATCH RULES
90 minutes.
Replay if scores still level.

See also

Notes

References

Bibliography

Notes

External links 
RSSSF: Wales - List of Cup Finals
Welsh Football Data Archive: WELSH CUP 1927/28
Welsh Football Data Archive: WELSH CUP FINAL 1927/28

1928
1927–28 in Welsh football
Bangor City F.C. matches
Cardiff City F.C. matches
1928 in Welsh sport